Hanson Lake is a lake in the east-central part of the Canadian province of Saskatchewan in the boreal forest ecozone of Canada. The lake is irregularly shaped with many bays, islands, and channels as it was formed by glaciers during the last ice age. It is fed by multiple rivers and creeks from surrounding hills, smaller lakes, and muskeg. Hanson Lake's outflow is through a short river at the eastern end of the lake as it flows into the Sturgeon-Weir River, a tributary of the Saskatchewan River.

There are no communities on the lake; the closest city is Flin Flon to the east. On the western shore is a provincial recreation site and on the southern shore is a mine. The lake is accessed the from Hanson Lake Road.

Description 
There are multiple bays and islands in Hanson Lake, notably McIlvenna Bay, Bertrum Bay, Winn Bay, and Winn Island. It is surrounded by several lakes that flow into it, including Sample Lake, Jake Pine Lake, Bad Carrot Lake, Guyader Lake, and Bay Lake. The outflow is at the far eastern point of the lake and it flows south-east into Halfway Lake. From Halfway Lake, the river flows east into Attree Lake, which is a lake along the course of the Sturgeon-Weir River. The Sturgeon-Weir River flows south-east into Namew Lake, then through Whitey Narrows into Cumberland Lake of the Saskatchewan River Delta. The whole system is part of the Hudson Bay drainage basin.

Hanson Lake Recreation Site 
Hanson Lake Recreation Site is a provincial recreation area on the western shore of Hanson Lake. It is accessed from Beaver Road, which branches off of the Hanson Lake Road. The site has a small campground, picnic area, and boat launch.

Hanson Lake Mine 
Hanson Lake Mine is a mine located along the southern shore of Hanson Lake. It is south of Winn Bay and east of McIlvenna Bay. The mine has a circular formation and is about 550 metres in diametre.

See also 
List of lakes of Saskatchewan
List of protected areas of Saskatchewan
Tourism in Saskatchewan
Hudson Bay drainage basin

References 

Lakes of Saskatchewan
Northern Saskatchewan Administration District